The mangos, Anthracothorax, are a genus of hummingbirds in the subfamily Trochilinae native to the Neotropics.

The genus Anthracothorax was introduced by the German zoologist Friedrich Boie in 1831. The type species was subsequently designated as the green-throated mango (Anthracothorax viridigula). The generic name combines the Ancient Greek anthrax meaning "coal" (i.e. black) with thōrax meaning "chest".

A molecular phylogenetic study published in 2014 found that Anthracothorax was paraphyletic with respect to Eulampis.

Species
The genus contains eight species:

References

 
Bird genera
Taxonomy articles created by Polbot